is a museum of Asian art in Nara, Nara.

The museum was established in 1960 to preserve and display the private collection of Kintetsu Corporation (named Kinki Nippon Railway Co., Ltd. till June 27, 2003).

Collection

This museum of Asian art has holdings of more than twenty thousand objects of sculpture, ceramics, lacquer, paintings, prints, textiles and calligraphy.  The museum features a program of regularly changing exhibitions. The founding director in 1960 was art historian Yukio Yashiro.

National treasures

See also
 List of National Treasures of Japan (paintings)
 Chinese Piling paintings

Notes

References
 Danilov, Victor J. (1992). A Planning Guide for Corporate Museums, Galleries, and Visitor Centers. New York: Greenwood Press. ; 
 Martin, John H, and Phyllis G Martin. (1993). Nara: a Cultural Guide to Japan's Ancient Capital. Tokyo: Charles E. Tuttle. ;

External links

 About the Museum Yamato Bunkakan

Art museums and galleries in Japan
Museums of Japanese art
Museums in Nara, Nara
Art museums established in 1960
1960 establishments in Japan